Saint-Rivoal is a commune in the Finistère department of Brittany in north-western France.

Population
Inhabitants of Saint-Rivoal are called in French Saint-Rivoaliens.

Breton language
As of 2010 and previous years, all primary-school children (numbering about 30), attended the bilingual public school, where Breton language is taught alongside French.

See also
Communes of the Finistère department
Parc naturel régional d'Armorique

References

External links

Official website 

Mayors of Finistère Association 

Communes of Finistère